The 2010 Challenge Bell was a tennis tournament played on indoor carpet courts. It was the 18th edition of the Challenge Bell, and was part of the WTA International tournaments of the 2010 WTA Tour. It took place at the PEPS de l'Université Laval in Quebec City, Canada, from September 13 through September 19, 2010.

Entrants

Seeds

1 Rankings are as of August 30, 2010

Other entrants
The following players received wildcards into the singles main draw:
 Heidi El Tabakh
 Rebecca Marino
 Valérie Tétreault

The following player entered the singles main draw with a protected ranking:
 Marina Erakovic

The following players received entry from the qualifying draw:
 Irina Falconi
 Stéphanie Foretz Gacon
 Alexa Glatch
 Tamira Paszek

Champions

Singles

 Tamira Paszek def.  Bethanie Mattek-Sands, 7–6(8–6), 2–6, 7–5

Doubles

 Sofia Arvidsson /  Johanna Larsson def.  Bethanie Mattek-Sands /  Barbora Záhlavová-Strýcová, 6–1, 2–6, [10–6]

External links
Official website

Challenge Bell
Tournoi de Québec
Challenge Bell
2010s in Quebec City